A Day Will Come may refer to:
 A Day Will Come (1934 film)
 A Day Will Come (1950 film)

See also
 The Day Will Come (disambiguation)